The 2020 British Academy Television Awards were held on 31 July 2020, hosted by British director and comic actor Richard Ayoade.

The nominations for the jury awards were announced on 4 June 2020, whilst the nominees for the audience award, "Virgin TV's Must-See Moments", were announced on 3 June 2020. The End of the F***ing World, Stath Lets Flats and Chernobyl each won two awards, with The End of the F***ing World taking home the Best Drama mask and Stath Lets Flats winning Best Scripted Comedy. In the news coverage awards, ITV won two masks.

The 2020 British Academy Television Craft Awards had been held on 17 July 2020. Both ceremonies were held during the COVID-19 pandemic with social distancing practices. The Craft Awards event was entirely virtual, while much of the Television Awards ceremony was connected by video call, though it was hosted and presented from an audience-less Television Centre in London. Combining wins from both events, Chernobyl set a new record for total BAFTA wins in one year, taking home nine masks from fourteen nominations. The Special Award was presented to Idris Elba.

Winners and nominees

Winners will be listed first and highlighted in boldface.

Programmes with multiple nominations
The following is a list of programmes and networks with multiple nominations at both the 2020 British Academy Television Awards and the 2020 British Academy Television Craft Awards.

Most major wins
The following is a list of programmes and networks with multiple wins at both the 2020 British Academy Television Awards and Television Craft Awards.

Ceremony

Nominations for the 2020 British Academy Television Awards were announced on 4 June 2020. Fleabag, Chernobyl, Giri/Haji and The Crown had the most nominations. The ceremony had originally been scheduled for 17 May 2020; though it was postponed, the qualification dates for eligible programming were not changed. Krishnendu Majumdar, the chair of BAFTA since June 2020, gave an announcement that it was important to celebrate the importance of television during the COVID-19 pandemic.

The ceremony was held on 31 July 2020 from 19:00 BST, the first major award show since the start of the pandemic. It was hosted by Richard Ayoade from a studio in Television Centre, London. Several performers presented individual awards in-studio, while other presenters and all the winners and nominees contributed over video either live or pre-recorded. This led to the interesting acceptance speech of Naomi Ackie, whose immediate reaction was to text people while live on video call – something for which she was humorously berated by presenter Himesh Patel. Other presenters at the ceremony included Aisling Bea, Greg Davies, Stacey Dooley, Jessica Hynes, Daisy Edgar-Jones, Jeff Goldblum, Ruth Madeley, Paul Mescal, Chris O'Dowd, Billy Porter, Michael Sheen, Nina Sosanya, David Tennant, Kermit the Frog, and Miss Piggy. Tim Minchin composed and performed an original comedy musical number to open the ceremony and performed the song Carry You (from the TV series Upright) for the end credits. An hour-long pre-show hosted by Tom Allen had been streamed on social media prior to the ceremony. Rotten Tomatoes' editorial on the event wrote that the ceremony "held all the drama of regular awards shows, regardless of location, mostly due to some big surprises".

Surprise results included both the Best Drama and Best Scripted Comedy winners: The End of the F***ing World won drama over favourite The Crown (both Netflix), while Stath Lets Flats (Channel 4) won comedy instead of the much-celebrated Fleabag (BBC Three). Additionally, Phoebe Waller-Bridge lost Best Female Comedy Performance to her Fleabag co-star Sian Clifford. The two Fleabag stars watched the ceremony together at Waller-Bridge's house but separated on video for their nominations to prevent audio feedback. After Clifford won the award, Waller-Bridge presented her with a statuette of the "Godmother", an item in the show.  During her acceptance speech, Clifford confirmed that the jury discussions for the year's awards were also done via video calls, and – speaking in the virtual backstage after winning – Clifford joked with Allen about the BAFTA award, a mask, being used as a facemask in public. Fleabag won only one award from the four for which it was nominated.

The HBO/Sky Atlantic drama Chernobyl won for two of its three nominations, having won many awards in the BAFTA Television Craft Awards held virtually earlier in the month. The two wins on top of seven at the Craft Awards increased the show's BAFTA total to a new record of nine in one year. The Best Actor winner for his role in Chernobyl, Jared Harris, said to reporters in the 'backstage' video call after his win: "[it is] incredibly generous of BAFTA, to award that many. I mean, one of the things that I've noticed about the BAFTA awards over the years is, they're pretty judicious about spreading the love". The Best Soap and Continuing Drama award was won by Emmerdale, with its executive producer Jane Hudson saying in her acceptance speech that all the soaps deserved recognition as they had already restarted shooting by the summer of 2020. As Best Actress, Glenda Jackson won her second BAFTA, having taken home her first over 25 years ago. Other winners were notably diverse, with first-time winners Will Sharpe and Naomi Ackie being named Best Supporting Actor and Actress, respectively. The BAFTA Special Award was presented to Idris Elba for his contributions in creating opportunities in the industry; the award was introduced by Taraji P. Henson, Matthew McConaughey, Ruth Wilson, and Grace Fori-Attah.

In Memoriam

Nicholas Parsons
Sheila Mercier
Gay Byrne
Leah Bracknell
Bob Angell
Tony Britton
Peter Sissons
Louis Mahoney
James Cellan Jones
Caroline Flack
Joe Longthorne
Tony Garnett
William Simons
Derek Fowlds
Michael Angelis
Eddie Large
Honor Blackman
Jean Fergusson
Earl Cameron
David Bellamy
Jill Gascoine
Diarmuid Lawrence
Tazeen Ahmad
Roy Hudd
Lynn Shelton
Clive James
Margarita Pracatan
Gary Rhodes
Lynn Faulds Wood
Tim Brooke-Taylor
Dame Vera Lynn

Sydney Lotterby, who died a few days before the ceremony, was not included in the montage but was named by Ayoade afterwards. The In Memoriam segment covered deaths in the 15 months since the last ceremony. A further "In Memory Of..." list, including international figures, was included on the BAFTA website.

See also
2020 in television
72nd Primetime Emmy Awards
73rd British Academy Film Awards
Impact of the COVID-19 pandemic on television

Notes

References

External links
Official website

2020
2020 in British television
2020 awards in the United Kingdom
July 2020 events in the United Kingdom
2020 television awards